Ronnie Bell (born January 28, 2000) is an American football wide receiver for the Michigan Wolverines. He was Michigan's offensive rookie of the year in 2018 and led the 2019 team with 48 receptions for 758 yards.

Early years
Bell was a multi-sport athlete at Park Hill High School in Kansas City, Missouri. As a senior, he caught 89 passes for 1,605 yards and 21 touchdowns, but he was not ranked in the top 1,000 high school football recruits. He originally committed as a basketball player to Missouri State.  After initially receiving no Division I FBS scholarship offers to play football, he was recruited late by Jim Harbaugh and in December 2017 committed to play football for the University of Michigan.

University of Michigan
Bell enrolled at Michigan in 2018. As a freshman, he had eight receptions for 145 yards and two touchdowns, including a 56-yard touchdown reception against Nebraska.  At the end of the 2018 season, he received the offensive rookie of the year award.

As a sophomore in 2019, Bell led the team with 81 receiving yards against Army, 81 yards against Wisconsin, 83 yards against Rutgers, 98 yards against Illinois, and 82 yards against Penn State. After dropping a game-tying pass in the end zone in the closing minutes against Penn State, Bell received national attention for the angry reaction by a Michigan fan and the subsequent rally of fan support behind him.

Against Michigan State on November 16, 2019, Bell had a career-high 150 receiving yards (117 in the first half) on nine catches. For the 2019 season, he was the Wolverines' leading receiver with 48 receptions for 758 yards. Following the 2019 season, Bell was named an honorable mention all-conference selection by the media.

In the COVID-shortened 2020 season, he was Michigan's leading receiver for the second consecutive year with 26 receptions and 401 receiving yards.

Bell's 2021 season ended when he sustained a knee injury in the season opener.

Against Indiana on October 8, 2022, Bell caught 11 passes for 121 yards. During the 2022 regular season, Bell was the team's leading receiver for the third time in his career with 62 receptions and 889 receiving yards.

College statistics

References

2000 births
Living people
American football wide receivers
Michigan Wolverines football players
Players of American football from Kansas City, Missouri